The Ancient Order of Hibernians (AOH) is an Irish Catholic fraternal organization. Members must be male, Catholic, and either born in Ireland or of Irish descent. Its largest membership is now in the United States, where it was founded in New York City in 1836, however, a reference to its existence as early as 1819 was found in a letter written from a Samuel Castwell to the eventual 7th President of the United States, Andrew Jackson. In the letter, Jackson had been nominated for membership into Castwell's Hibernian Society. The letter was dated May 26, 1819. The name was adopted by groups of Irish immigrants in the United States, its purpose to act as guards to shield Catholic churches from anti-Catholic forces in the mid-19th century, and to assist Irish Catholic immigrants, especially those who faced discrimination or harsh coal mining working conditions. Many members in the coal mining area of Pennsylvania had a background with the Molly Maguires. It became an important focus of Irish American political activity.

Ireland

Origins 

The organization had its roots in the Defenders and the Ribbonmen, Catholic agrarian movements of the 18th and 19th centuries. It emerged in Ulster at the end of the 19th century in opposition to the Orange Order. It was organized by Joseph Devlin of Belfast, who was Grand Master by 1905. The AOH was closely associated with the Irish Parliamentary Party, its members mainly members of the party. It was strongly opposed to secular ideologies such as those of the Irish Republican Brotherhood (the IRB), who were most unhappy at the re-emergence of this old rival "right-wing" nationalist society. Membership in the group was initially banned by the Catholic Church, although this was lifted in 1904.

From a membership of 5,000 in 1900, nearly all in Ulster, it climbed to 64,000 by 1909, complementing the United Irish League. By 1914 the order had spread throughout the country, mainly because of its utility as a patronage, brokerage and recreational association. As a vehicle for Irish nationalism, the AOH greatly influenced the sectarian aspect of Irish politics in the early twentieth century. In Ulster and elsewhere it acted as an unruly but vigorous militant support organization for Devlin, Dillon and Redmond against radicals and against William O'Brien: O'Brien regarded himself as having been driven from the party by militant Hibernians at the "Baton Convention" of 1909.

The ceremonial aspects of the Order resembled those of the Orange Order with green replacing orange on sashes and banners. This led to opponents such as Jim Larkin calling it the "Ancient Order of Catholic Orangemen".

After 1916 
After the 1916 Easter Rising the organisation declined outside of Ulster, its members absorbed into Sinn Féin and the Irish Republican Army (the IRA). In many areas the organisation provided by the AOH was the nearest thing to a paramilitary force. On the other hand, on 13 June 1916 Joe Devlin chaired an AOH Convention in Dublin that approved the proposed partition of Ireland by 475 votes to 265.

Many republican leaders in the 1916–1923 period, among them Seán Mac Diarmada, J. J. Walsh, and Rory O'Connor, had been "Hibs" before the formation of the Irish Volunteers in 1913.

The AOH is also significant as a link between the new nationalist organisations and the century-old tradition of popular militant societies. More directly, it lingered on as a pro-Treaty support organisation. Some Hibernians fought in the Irish Brigade in the Spanish Civil War. The quasi-Fascist Blueshirts movement of the 1930s may, in fact, have owed as much to the Ribbon tradition which it so much resembled, as it did to continental analogies.

Recent decades 
Within Ulster generally, but especially within Northern Ireland, the AOH remains a visible but somewhat marginal part of the Catholic community. It parades at Easter, Lady Day and a few other times a year.

At the beginning of The Troubles, the AOH placed a voluntary ban on its members parading until 1975, though records of some parades taking place in defiance of the ban were reported. In 1978 an estimated 10,000 participants attended a parade in Kilrea. Since then there has been a rapid decrease of numbers and usually around 20 divisions parade at a single location.

The locations of AOH parades in Northern Ireland generally tend to be cities with a high Catholic population, coupled with the AOH's desire not to provoke trouble. County Fermanagh has never hosted an AOH parade since the onset of The Troubles and County Armagh has held one. The majority of the 21 locations for parades have been in counties Antrim, Down and Londonderry. On occasion when the parade has been held in an area with a significant loyalist population it has been met with an aggressive protest, notably Garvagh in 1985 and Armoy in 1989 which held its first AOH parade in 35 years.

United States

Early years 
The order was founded in the United States on 4 May 1836, at St. James Church in New York City, near the old Five Points neighbourhood. A branch was formed the same year at Pottsville, Pennsylvania. The existence and activities of the order were concealed for some years.

In 1850, members prevented the burning of St. Patrick's Old Cathedral by mobs of anti-Catholic Know Nothings.

During the late 1860s and early 1870s many of the lodges of the order in Pennsylvania were infiltrated by the Molly Maguires. However the Molly Maguires and their criminal activities were condemned at the 1876 national convention of the AOH and the order was reorganised in the Pennsylvania coal areas.

Split, reunion and auxiliary 
In 1884 there was a split in the organisation. The order had previously been governed by the Board of Erin, which had governed the order in Ireland, Great Britain and the United States, but was composed of officers selected exclusively by the organisations in Ireland and Great Britain. The majority left in 1884 and became the Ancient Order of Hibernians of America, while the small group called itself Ancient Order of Hibernians, Board of Erin.  In 1897 the Ancient Order of Hibernians, Board of Erin, had approximately 40,000 members concentrated in New York, New Jersey, Ohio, Illinois and Michigan, while the Ancient Order of Hibernians of America had nearly 125,000 members scattered throughout nearly every state in the union. The two groups reunited in 1898.

A female auxiliary, the Daughters of Erin, was formed in 1894, and had 20,000 members in 1897. It was attached to the larger, "American" version of the order.

In 1898, the Port Richmond Division 87 was formed in Philadelphia, Pennsylvania. It remains one of the oldest continuously chartered divisions within the Philadelphia County Board and Pennsylvania State Board.

The Ladies Auxiliary of the Ancient Order of Hibernians raised $50,000 to build the Nuns of the Battlefield sculpture in Washington, D.C., which the United States Congress authorised in 1918. The Irish-American sculptor, Jerome Connor, ended up suing the order for non-payment.

John F. Kennedy joined the AOH in 1947.

1960s onwards 
The AOH had 181,000 members in 1965, and 171,000 in 736 local units or "Divisions" in 1979.

U.S. Congressman Mario Biaggi received the Ancient Order of Hibernians Friend of the Irish Award in 2011.

In 1982, in a revival of Hibernianism, the Thomas Francis Meagher Division No. 1 formed in Helena, Montana, dedicated to the principles of the order and to restoring a historically accurate record of Brigadier General Meagher's contributions to Montana. Soon after, six additional divisions formed in Montana.

The Brothers of St. Patrick Division of the Ancient Order of Hibernians in America was established at Brothers of St. Patrick in Midway City, California, in 1995.

In 2002, the Fr. Bernard Donnelly Division was established in Johnson County, Kansas dedicated to community service and reintroducing Hibernianism to Kansas. Its name honors the founder of Kansas City's Irish Community, Fr. Bernard Donnelly (c. 1800-1880), an immigrant from County Cavan.

In 2013, The Ancient Order of Hibernians raised and distributed over $200,000 to aid victims of Hurricane Sandy.

In 2014, the AOH called for a boycott of the retailer Spencer's for selling products the AOH says promote anti-Irish stereotypes and irresponsible drinking.

On 10 May 2014 a memorial to Commodore John Barry, an immigrant from Wexford who was a naval hero of the American Revolution and who holds commission number one in the subsequent U.S. Navy, was dedicated on the grounds of the United States Naval Academy.  The memorial and associated "Barry Gate" was presented to the academy by the members of the Ancient Order of Hibernians.

On 17 August 2017, the John Fitzgerald Division was chartered in Lincoln, Nebraska.

On 7 July 2018, the first division in Tennessee, the Sons of Erin, Division No. 1, was formed in Nashville, Tennessee.

On 23 April 2019, the first division in Arizona, No. 1, was formed in Phoenix, Arizona. The division was formed on the grounds of the Irish Cultural Center.

St Patrick's Day parade 
The order organised the New York City St. Patrick's Day Parade for 150 years until 1993, when control was transferred to an independent committee amid controversy over the exclusion of Irish-American gay and lesbian groups.

Buildings 
Several buildings of the Ancient Order of Hibernians are listed on the U.S. National Register of Historic Places or are otherwise notable.

See also 

 Banners in Northern Ireland
 Friends of Irish Freedom
 Hibernian Rifles
 Knights of Equity

References

Citations

Bibliography

Further reading
 
 
  Butte, Montana Irish Collection (University of Montana Archives)
 John Concannon and the Ancient Order of Hibernians Collection (The Monsignor Field Archives & Special Collection Center at Seton Hall University)

External links

 Official American website

 
1836 establishments in New York (state)
Catholic Church in the United States
Conservative organizations in the United States
Ethnic fraternal orders in the United States
Fraternal orders
Irish-American organizations
Irish secret societies
Men's organizations in the United States
Organizations established in 1836
Religious organizations based in the United States
Secret societies in the United States